KTXW (1120 AM) is a commercial radio station licensed to Manor, Texas, and serving the Greater Austin radio market. The station broadcasts a Christian Talk and Teaching radio format. It is owned by GLG Media, Inc.

KTXW is powered at 5,600 watts by day. But because AM 1120 is a clear channel frequency reserved for KMOX in St. Louis, KTXW must reduce power at night to 155 watts to avoid interference. KTXW is also heard on FM translator station K266CI at 101.1 MHz in Austin.

Programming
KTXW airs both national and local religious shows, using a brokered programming arrangement. Hosts pay for their time on the air and may seek donations to support their ministry. National religious leaders heard on KTXW include Charles Stanley, Chuck Swindoll, David Jeremiah, and Jim Daly. KTXW also carries syndicated talk shows from the Salem Radio Network, hosted by Eric Metaxas and Jay Sekulow.

History
The station first signed on the air in 2010 as KIXL. Originally the 1120 kHz frequency was assigned to Cleburne, Texas, near Dallas. KCLE had been on the air from 1947 to 2008, when it moved to AM 1140, getting a boost in power and better coverage of the Dallas-Fort Worth Metroplex. It is now KHFX.

KCLE's move to another frequency created the opportunity for AM 1120 to go on the air in the Austin radio market.

Translators

References

External links

Gospel radio stations in the United States
TXW
Radio stations established in 2014
2014 establishments in Texas
TXW